The Duke's Head is a Grade II listed pub in Putney, London.

Location 
The pub is between Putney Embankment and the Lower Richmond road, on the corners with Thames place.

History 

A public house is thought to have been on the site from 1774, and the current pub building dates from 1864 with fittings from 1894, the basement was used by Putney Town Rowing Club for storage of boats.

The pub overlooks the start of the University Boat Races and is close to the Boat Race start stone.

Management 
The pub is managed by Young & Co and was its first smoke free venue in 2006.

References

Pubs in the London Borough of Wandsworth
Grade II listed pubs in London
Grade II listed buildings in the London Borough of Wandsworth
Commercial buildings completed in 1864
Putney